Chionodes holosericella (or Gelechia danieli) is a moth of the family Gelechiidae. It is found in Norway, Sweden, Finland, Latvia, Estonia, France, Germany, Austria, Italy, Croatia, Slovakia, Ukraine and Russia. Outside of Europe, it is found in the Caucasus, from Siberia to the Magadan Oblast and in South Korea.

The wingspan is 15–18 mm. Adults have been recorded on wing from June to August.

References

Moths described in 1854
Chionodes
Moths of Europe
Moths of Asia